Verley is a surname. Notable people with the surname include: 

Ava Deluca-Verley (born 1989), French-American actress
Bernard Verley (born 1939), French actor and producer
Bertie Verley (1873–1907), Jamaican cricketer
Ilona Verley, Canadian-American drag queen
Ivy de Verley (1879–1963), Jamaican artist
Renaud Verley (born 1945), French actor, brother of Bernard